Cassandra Marlin Balchin (24 May 1962 – 12 July 2012) was a British journalist and women's rights campaigner.

Early life and education
Balchin was born in England on 24 May 1962. Her mother Yovanka (later Jane),  Tomich, was a Yugoslavian refugee and a journalist; her father was psychologist and writer Nigel Balchin (1908–1970). She spent some of her childhood with her mother's family in Yugoslavia, and also spent time in Glemsford, Suffolk.

Balchin graduated from the London School of Economics in 1983 with a B.Sc. in government, having studied Russian government and history.

Career
After graduating, Balchin moved to Pakistan to work as a journalist, and lived there for 17 years. During this time she became involved in women's rights, wrote Women, law and society: an action manual for NGOs and edited A handbook on family law in Pakistan. She returned to the UK in 2000, and helped to establish the UK office of Women Living Under Muslim Laws. She was a co-founder and chair of the Muslim Women's Network UK and a co-founder of  Musawah, "Sisters in Islam", in Malaysia. She was involved with Women Against Fundamentalism, and was a senior research consultant with the Association for Women's Rights in Development (AWID) on their "Resisting and Challenging Religious Fundamentalism" project from 2007 until her death.

Death
Balchin died from cancer on 12 July 2012, aged 50. She was survived by her two adult sons and her mother.

Selected publications

References

1962 births
2012 deaths
British women activists
Alumni of the London School of Economics